William Holden (c. 1824 – June 3, 1884) was the 11th Lieutenant Governor of California, 1867–1871.

Biography
Holden was born in Kentucky.  He studied law, attained admission to the bar in 1845, and practiced in Johnson County.

He relocated to California in 1850, settled in Stanislaus County, and worked as a farmer and merchant in addition to practicing law.  A Democrat, he became active in politics, and served in both the California State Assembly (1857-1858), (1865-1866), (1881-1882) and California State Senate (1858-1860), (1862-1864).

In 1866, Holden ran successfully for Lieutenant Governor, and served from 1867 to 1871.

Holden died in Healdsburg, California on June 3, 1884.

References

Sources

Magazines

Books

 

1884 deaths
Democratic Party members of the California State Assembly
Democratic Party California state senators
Lieutenant Governors of California
Year of birth uncertain